The red-vented cockatoo (Cacatua haematuropygia), also known as the Philippine cockatoo and locally katala, abukay, agay or kalangay, is a species of cockatoo. It is endemic to the Philippines though pressured by various environmental degradation and illegal pet trades, the population of the Philippine cockatoo is somehow growing owing to Katala Organization.It is roughly the size and shape of the Tanimbar corella, but is easily distinguished by the red feathers around the vent. It is threatened by habitat loss and the cage-bird trade.

Description 

The plumage is all white with red undertail coverts tipped white, yellowish undertail and pale yellow underwings.

Ebird describes it is  "A rare large parrot of forest on Palawan and several other scattered islands. Heavily persecuted. Can roost on small islets or in mangroves and forage in more open areas, including agricultural fields. Mostly white with a pale yellowish cheek, undertail, and underwings and a red patch under the base of the tail. Note the pale bill and the bare white skin around the eye. Hidden crest is usually held flat. Unmistakable. Voice includes various nasal or rasping squawks.

The red-vented cockatoo makes a characteristic bleating call, as well as screeching or whistling noises that are common to most cockatoos. It is quieter than most cockatoos, and much quieter than the umbrella cockatoo or Moluccan cockatoo.

Habitat and Conservation Status 

It appears to be restricted to lowland primary and/or secondary forest predominantly below 50 m, in or adjacent to riverine or coastal areas with mangroves.

The IUCN Red List has assessed this bird as critically endangered with an estimate of 430 - 750 mature individuals.  Red-vented cockatoos were formerly widely distributed on all larger and many smaller islands of the Philippines, excluding northern and central Luzon. In the early 1990s the total wild population was estimated at 1000–4000. However, by 2008 this was reduced to probably less than 1000. Remnant populations exist on the islands of Palawan, Tawitawi, Mindanao and Masbate. The species' stronghold is the Palawan Faunal Region where the Katala Foundation has been running the Philippine cockatoo Conservation Programme since 1998. There are around 180 found in wilderness conservation in the municipality of Narra and Puerto Princesa, Palawan, particularly in Rasa Island. The efforts for conservation of the Katala Foundation are threatened by plans to build a coal-fired power station on Palawan's coast. Environmental organizations like the Katala Foundation or Rainforest Rescue are trying to prevent the construction.

Populations have decreased dramatically due to illegal trapping for the cage-bird trade. The high price fetched per bird (c. US$300 in Manila in 2006) means that chicks are taken from virtually every accessible nest. Other contributing factors are loss of coastal habitat and persecution as an agricultural pest.  1992, an international captive-breeding programme was initiated, with 39 birds kept under the European Studbook in 2007. It is also threatened by habitat loss  deforestation still continues thanks to both legal and illegal logging, conversion into farmland, mining and road and urban development. In its stronghold on Rasa Island, it is threatened by climate change and extreme weather in which droughts caused up to 60% nest fatality.

Thanks to the efforts of the Katala Foundation the population has increased in key sites where the population increased from 23 in 1998 to  260-340 individuals by end of 2015. Individuals have reportedly 'self-introduced' from Rasa Island to the mainland indicating that Rasa may be reaching carrying capacity.. Despite these massive efforts, it is believed that the cockatoo population is still decreasing overall with the many threats affecting other sites.

Currently, sites are assessed and tested for their suitability for translocation. An attempt on a resort island in northern Palawan indicated that rescued hand-raised birds can adapt well to natural conditions including foraging and predator avoidance but was terminated owing to problems caused by tameness. Siargao is being assessed and made suitable for reintroduction efforts.

See also
Katala Foundation, Inc.

References

External links

 
 Katala Foundation Incorporated
 Oriental Bird Images: "Philippine cockatoo"

Corellas
Endemic birds of the Philippines
Birds described in 1776
Taxa named by Philipp Ludwig Statius Müller
Species endangered by the pet trade
Species endangered by mangrove destruction
Species endangered by logging
Species endangered by deliberate extirpation efforts
Species endangered by use as food
Species endangered by invasive species